A hellhound is a mythological hound that embodies a guardian or a servant of hell, the devil, or the underworld. Hellhounds occur in mythologies around the world, with the best known examples being Cerberus from Greek mythology, Garmr from Norse mythology, the black dogs of English folklore, and the fairy hounds of Celtic mythology. Physical characteristics vary, but they are commonly black, anomalously overgrown, supernaturally strong, and often have red eyes or accompanied by flames.

By locale

Europe

Belgium
 ("Old Red Eyes") or the "Beast of Flanders" was a demon reported in Flanders, Belgium in the 18th century who would take the form of a large black hound with fiery red eyes.

Czech lands
Numerous sightings of hellhounds persist throughout the Czech lands.

France
In France in AD 856 a black hound was said to materialize in a church even though the doors were shut. The church grew dark as it padded up and down the aisle as if looking for someone. The dog then vanished as suddenly as it had appeared. On mainland Normandy the  wanders the streets of Bayeux on winter nights as a phantom dog, gnawing on bones and dragging chains along with it. In Lower Brittany there are stories of a ghost ship crewed by the souls of criminals with hellhounds set to guard them and inflict on them a thousand tortures.

Germany
In Germany, it was believed that the devil would appear as a black hellhound, especially on Walpurgisnacht.

Greece

In Greek mythology, Cerberus, often referred to as the hound of Hades, is a multi-headed dog that guards the gates of the Underworld to prevent the dead from leaving. He was the offspring of the monsters Echidna and Typhon and was usually described as having three heads, a serpent for a tail, and snakes protruding from multiple parts of his body.

Scandinavia
In Norse mythology, Garmr or Garm (Old Norse for "rag") is a wolf or dog associated with both the Goddess Hel and Ragnarök and described as a blood-stained guardian of Hel's gate.

Spain

Catalonia
In Catalan myth, Dip is an evil, black, hairy hound, an emissary of the Devil, who sucks people's blood. Like other figures associated with demons in Catalan myth, he is lame in one leg. Dip is pictured on the escutcheon of Pratdip.

Galicia
In Galicia, the Urco was a giant black hound that led the Santa Compaña, a version of the Wild Hunt.

United Kingdom

England

The myth is common across Great Britain in the form of the "black dogs" of English folklore. The earliest written record of the "hellhound" is in the 11th and 12th Century Peterborough version of the Anglo-Saxon Chronicle, which speaks of a "wild hunt" through the forest between Peterborough and Stamford.

Wales
The gwyllgi (compound noun of either gwyllt "wild" or gwyll "twilight" + ci "dog") is a mythical black dog from Wales that appears as an English mastiff with baleful breath and blazing red eyes.

Cŵn Annwn 

In Welsh mythology and folklore, Cŵn Annwn ("hounds of Annwn") were the spectral hounds of Annwn, the otherworld of Welsh myth. They were associated with a form of the Wild Hunt, presided over by Gwynn ap Nudd (rather than Arawn, king of Annwn in the First Branch of the Mabinogi). Christians came to dub these mythical creatures as "The Hounds of Hell" or "Dogs of Hell" and theorized they were therefore owned by Satan. However, the Annwn of medieval Welsh tradition is an otherworldly paradise and not a hell or abode of dead souls.

In Wales, they were associated with migrating geese, supposedly because their honking in the night is reminiscent of barking dogs. They are supposed to hunt on specific nights (the eves of St. John, St. Martin, Saint Michael the Archangel, All Saints, Christmas, New Year, Saint Agnes, Saint David, and Good Friday), or just in the autumn and winter. Some say Arawn only hunts from Christmas to Twelfth Night. The Cŵn Annwn also came to be regarded as the escorts of souls on their journey to the Otherworld. The hounds are sometimes accompanied by a fearsome hag called Mallt-y-Nos, "Matilda of the Night". An alternative name in Welsh folklore is Cŵn Mamau ("Hounds of the Mothers").

The Americas

Latin America
Black hellhounds with fiery eyes are reported throughout Latin America from Mexico to Argentina under a variety of names including the Perro Negro (Spanish for black dog), Nahual (Mexico), Huay Chivo, and Huay Pek (Mexico) – alternatively spelled Uay/Way/Waay Chivo/Pek, Cadejo (Central America), the dog Familiar (Argentina) and the Lobizon (Paraguay and Argentina). They are usually said to be either incarnations of the Devil or a shape-changing sorcerer.

United States
The legend of a hellhound has persisted in Meriden, Connecticut since the 19th century. The dog is said to haunt the Hanging Hills: a series of rock ridges and gorges that serve as a popular recreation area and can also be known as a protector of the supernatural. The first non-local account came from W. H. C. Pychon in The Connecticut Quarterly, in which it is described as a death omen. It is said that, "If you meet the Black Dog once, it shall be for joy; if twice, it shall be for sorrow; and the third time shall bring death."

The term is also common in American blues music, such as with Robert Johnson's 1937 song, "Hellhound on My Trail"

Asia

Arabia
Jinn, although not necessarily evil, but often thought of as malevolent entities, are thought to use black dogs as their mounts. The negative depiction of dogs probably derives from their close association with "eating the dead" (relishing bones) and digging out graves. The jinn likewise is often said to roam around graveyards and eating corpses. These characteristics relates them to each other.

India
The Mahākanha Jātaka of the Buddhist Pali Canon includes a story about a black hound named Mahākanha (Pali; lit. "Great black"). Led by the god Śakra in the guise of a forester, Mahākanha scares unrighteous people toward righteousness so that fewer people will be reborn in hell. 

His appearance portends the moral degeneration of the human world, when monks and nuns do not behave as they should and humanity has gone astray from ethical livelihood.

Japan
"escorting dog") is a yōkai that resembles a dog. The okuri-inu closely stalks and follows people who are walking along mountain paths in nighttime. If by chance the person falls over they will be immediately eaten up, but if they pretend to be having a short rest they will not be attacked.

In popular culture

In literature 
In Goethe's Faust, the Devil Mephistopheles first appears to Faust in the form of a black poodle which follows him home through a field.
 Arthur Conan Doyle's The Hound of the Baskervilles
 In Thomas Mann's novel from 1947 Doctor Faustus, the 'Faustian' hero Adrian Leverkuhn had two hounds: Suso and Kaschperl which are both hellhounds sent by Mephistopheles.
 In Piers Anthony's fantasy novel On A Pale Horse, Satan sends hellhounds to attack Zane (Death) and bring him back to hell. The hounds are immortal but are dispatched by Death's magical scythe.
 Hellhounds are the pets of Harpies in Anne Bishop's The Black Jewels Series, and hellhounds (called Shadow Hounds) appear in Anne Bishop's Tir Alainn trilogy.
 The Witches have barghests being demonic creatures along with the Witches. Barghests, however, are always male and Witches are always female. Barghests are never described, but could be seen as dogs.
 Hellhounds feature in Percy Jackson & the Olympians by Rick Riordan. The most prominent hellhound in the series is Mrs. O'Leary, who was previously owned by Daedalus before becoming the pet of Percy Jackson.
 Hellhounds feature in Laurell K. Hamilton's Merry Gentry series.
 In Anthony Horowitz's book Raven's Gate, the protagonist, Matt, is pursued through a forest by demonic canines, after being discovered eavesdropping on a witchcraft ritual.
 Hellhounds (called darkhounds) appears several times in Robert Jordan's fantasy book series The Wheel of Time. Darkhounds are a particularly nasty form of Shadowspawn. 
 Hellhounds appear in Roger Zelazny's 1970 new wave fantasy novel Nine Princes in Amber.
 In Neil Gaiman's and Terry Pratchett's novel Good Omens, Adam (The Antichrist) receives a hellhound companion that he simply names "Dog."

In film 
 A black colored rottweiler serves Damien, the child anti-Christ in the 1976 film The Omen. In folklore 'Black dog' hell hounds are believed to be supernatural servant beings of Satan.
 Two Hellhounds named Zuul and Vinz are key plot elements in the 1984 film Ghostbusters, in which they are minions of the ancient entity Gozer.
 A Hellhound named Sammael is one of the main antagonists in the first Hellboy film.
 Hellhounds appear in the movie Percy Jackson & the Olympians: The Lightning Thief as pets of Persephone and Hades, differing from the books' portrayal of them.
 A Hellhound named Thorn is the guardian of the vampire Max in The Lost Boys.
 Hellhounds appear in the Don Bluth film All Dogs Go to Heaven. In a nightmare sequence, Charlie is sent to the abyss of the Underworld and meets a Beast called the Hellhound and is humiliated by the Hellhound's demonic minions.
 In the made-for-TV horror fantasy film, Hellhounds part of the Maneater Series The hellhounds appear to pets of Hades
 In Predators and The Predator, Hellhounds are extra-terrestrial dogs owned by the Yautja Species.

In television 
 Hellhounds appear in the television show Supernatural (e.g., in episode 5.10 "Abandon All Hope"). 
 In Lost Tapes season 1 episode 13, the episode is about Hellhounds, including the aspect that if one sees them three times they will die. 
 Hellhounds appeared in the twentieth episode of Buffy the Vampire Slayer (season 3) "The Prom". 
 Hellhounds also appeared in the show Monsters and Mysteries in America during season 2 on Destination TV.  Where they were seen terrorizing a California community.
 The MTV series Teen Wolf features a character who is a hellhound.<ref>[http://www.mtv.com/news/2258606/teen-wolf-hellhound-parrish/ Peckham, Tina Smithers. "Does 'Teen Wolfs Hellhound Mean Good Or Bad News For Beacon Hills?", MTV, September 2, 2015]</ref>
 In the television series The X-Files a Hellhound is prominently featured in the 2018 episode "Familiar" where it guards the gates of the underworld in a secret Connecticut Puritan graveyard, and attacks several victims.
 Hellhounds have made a few small appearances as anthropomorphic in the pilot episode for "Hazbin Hotel", during Charlie’s song "INSIDE OF EVERY DEMON IS A RAINBOW".
 In the YouTube animated spin-off series "Helluva Boss" an anthropomorphic receptionist named "Loona". She can be seen working at a company called "I.M.P." another Hellhound named "Vortex" also makes an appearance in Season 1, episode 3, guarding Verosika. Like incubi and succubi, Hellhounds apparently have the ability to transform into humans.
In Episode 9 of Inuyasha: The Final Act, "Sesshōmaru in the Underworld", Sesshomaru's mother uses her necklace the Meido Stone to a portal from the underworld to summon the Hellhound, but it's unaffected to the Meido Zangetsuha and the beast swallowed Rin and Kohaku as it returned to the underworld, and Sesshomaru after it to save the children and killed it with the Tenseiga.

 In games 
 In Call of Duty: World at War, Call of Duty: Black Ops, Call of Duty: Black Ops II, Call of Duty: Black Ops III , Call of Duty: Black Ops IIII , and Call of Duty: Black Ops Cold War, in the Zombies mode, fiery hellhounds are a type of enemy. They first appear at the start of either rounds 5, 6, or 7, and come back every 4 or 5 rounds.
 In Heroes of Might and Magic III, the hell hound is a recruitable 3rd-level unit from the Inferno town that can be upgraded into a Cerberus.
 Hellhound is also a creature of chaos in the game Master of Magic.
 In Neverwinter Nights, the hellhound is available as a familiar for wizards and sorcerers.
 In Eye of the Beholder, hellhounds appear on one of the deeper dungeon levels.
 In the video game NiGHTS: Journey of Dreams, one of the bosses for Will's dream is called Cerberus and is, as stated by Reala, a hellhound.
 In the Pokémon franchise, the two Pokémon Houndour and Houndoom are based on the hellhound.
 In the MMORPG RuneScape, hellhounds are a type of demon, but are not tied to the underworld.
 In the video game The Witcher the Hellhound is a boss monster.
 Hellhounds are creatures that appear in The Elder Scrolls: Arena.
 Hellhounds are minions of the Burning Legion in Warcraft III: Reign of Chaos.
 Hellhounds called Skinned Hounds appear in The Elder Scrolls IV: Shivering Isles, a DLC for The Elder Scrolls IV: Oblivion.
 Hellhounds called Death Hounds appear in Dawnguard, the first DLC for The Elder Scrolls V: Skyrim.
 In War Commander (a real-time strategy game on Facebook), "Hellhounds" refers to a rogue computer-controlled faction.
 In Dungeon Keeper, Hellhounds are a species of creature that can be attracted to your dungeon by means of the Scavenger Room. They are said to be useful guards and good at locating enemies. They are interpreted as having two heads and the ability to breathe fire.
 In Dragon's Dogma, Fire-breathing hellhounds start to appear on land after you defeat the dragon.
 In Ultima Online, Hellhounds are a type of hostile creature spawn that appear in a few dungeon areas.
 In Don't Starve, Hounds, a wolf-like enemy, are based on Hellhounds.
 In Age of Mythology Hellhounds come out of Hekate's god power Tartarian, which creates a gate to Tartarus, in addition the Greek titan is a three-headed Hellhound resembling Cerberus, the Hellhound that guards the Greek underworld.
 Hellhounds appear in the MMORPG Anarchy Online, as strong white dogs that are hard to defeat.
 "Heck Hound", a child-friendly name change of the hellhound, is the name of a Fire spell in the MMORPG Wizard101. In the game they also appear as pets.
 In Devil May Cry 3, one of the first bosses is Cerberus.
 Fire Emblem: The Sacred Stones features two hellhounds- Mauthe Dhoog and Gwyllgi- as enemy classes.
 In the Final Fantasy series Cerberus appears as a boss, and can be summoned to fight with your party with a special move in some instances. Likewise the hellhound sometimes makes an appearance in one of its mythological forms, such as Garm from Final Fantasy VI.
 In Ogre Battle: The March of the Black Queen, the hellhound is a monster that can be recruited by Wizards and upgraded into the Cerberus (despite still having only one head due to sprite limitations).
 In Blood, hellhounds appear as regular enemies starting in episode 3. Additionally, Cerberus appears as the boss of episode 3 and makes occasional appearances afterwards, most notably two of them serve as the final encounter of the expansion Cryptic Passage.

 Dungeons & Dragons 

In the Dungeons & Dragons fantasy roleplaying game, the hell hound is a hyena-like creature which can breathe fire and hunts in packs. It is classified as an outsider from the Nine Hells.

The hell hound was introduced to the game in its first supplement, Greyhawk (1975). The hell hound appeared in the D&D Basic Set (1977), the D&D Expert Set (1981, 1983). and the Dungeons & Dragons Rules Cyclopedia (1991). The hell hound appears in the first edition Monster Manual. The Monster Manual was reviewed by Don Turnbull in the British magazine White Dwarf #8 (August/September 1978). As part of his review, Turnbull comments on several monsters appearing in the book, noting that the breath weapon of the "much-feared" hell hound has been altered from its previous appearance. The hell hound appeared in second edition in the Monstrous Compendium Volume Two (1989), and reprinted in the Monstrous Manual (1993). The hell hound appeared in the third edition Monster Manual (2000), and in the 3.5 revised Monster Manual (2003) with the Nessian warhound. The hell hound appears in the fourth edition Monster Manual for this edition, under the Hound entry.

A hellhound resembles a mangy, skinny, somewhat demonic hyena-like creature with red eyes and draconic ears. It has the ability to breathe fire. However, the Fourth Edition depicts them as nearly skeletal canines wreathed in flame. The hell hound enjoys causing pain and suffering and it hunts accordingly. A favorite pack tactic is to silently surround prey, and then cause two hell hounds to close in and make the victim back into another hell hound's fiery breath. They will attack with their claws and teeth if they have to. If the prey manages to escape, the hell hounds will pursue it relentlessly. Hell hounds are also quick and agile. Another type of hell hound is the Nessian warhound. Nessian warhounds are coal black mastiffs the size of draft horses, and are often fitted with shirts of infernal chainmail. Hell hounds cannot speak, but understand Infernal.

The hell hound was ranked ninth among the ten best low-level monsters by the authors of Dungeons & Dragons For Dummies''. The authors described them as the "first serious representative of a class of monsters your players will be fighting against for their whole careers: evil outsiders," and that they are interesting because they "introduce players to monsters with an area-effect attack (their fiery breath)."

See also

References

External links 
 Hellhounds, Werewolves, Trolls and the Germanic Underworld

Demons
European legendary creatures
Greek legendary creatures
Scandinavian legendary creatures
Mythological dogs
Supernatural legends
Dogs in religion
Devon folklore